Ashley Leechin (born 1993/1994) is an American social media personality and nurse known for her resemblance to singer-songwriter Taylor Swift.

Life and career
Ashley Leechin was born in 1993 or 1994. She began listening to American singer-songwriter Taylor Swift in 2006, when she released "Tim McGraw". According to Leechin, people first noted the similarities in her and Swift's appearance when she was around 14 years old.

In 2019, Leechin graduated from nursing school and became a registered nurse. She worked as a trauma nurse in Nashville, Tennessee, United States, where she lived for approximately a year in 2020. During the COVID-19 pandemic, she felt exhausted and burnt out, and downloaded TikTok. Leechin first went viral as Swift's look-alike after the singer's fans discovered a video of her doing laundry in 2021. As viewers noted her likeness to Swift, she created videos making fun of it and using the singer's audios. In one viral video, she dressed up like Swift and pretended to go to Target, observing how passersby would exclaim, "Oh, my God, it's Taylor", as she passed. Initially, Swift's fans were amused by Leechin's posts, especially after Swift herself commented on one of Leechin's videos, stating that her mother had made a comment about her similarity to Swift. The criticism against Leechin soon began to grow, however; Leechin frequently sported Swift's hairstyle and lip color, and she frequently posted videos in which she alluded to sharing Swift's love of cats and Grey's Anatomy.

Leechin's family moved to Utah, United States, in 2021. She is married with two children.

References

1990s births
Living people
21st-century American women
American TikTokers
American women nurses